Sayed Mohammad Jaffar Shah (December 1911 – 21 March 1937) was an Indian field hockey player who competed in the 1932 Summer Olympics and 1936 Summer Olympics.

Early life and education
He was born in Shergarh, District Montgomery, British India (now in Punjab, Pakistan). Jaffar received his education at the Aitchison College, Lahore and at the Government College Lahore.

Playing career
In 1932 he was a member of the All India team that represented the country in the Field hockey at the 1932 Summer Olympics. The team won the gold medal.  He played two matches as forward.

Four years later in 1936, he was again the member of the All India Field Hockey team. The team again won the gold medal for Field hockey at the 1936 Summer Olympics. He played five matches as forward.

Death & Memory 
He died as a result of a shooting accident near Lahore on banks of river Ravi, in 1937.

A hockey pavilion was constructed at Aitchison College Lahore in 1939 as a tribute to the memory of Jaffar and his services to hockey in India.

Jaffar Memorial hockey tournament is organised annually by Ali Institute of Education in Lahore.

Grave and Epitaph

The inscription on the gravestone reads
"Syed Mohammad Jaffar Shah Kirmani son of Syed Nawazish Hussain Shah Kirmani"
"Date of Birth: December 1911. Date of Death: March 1937"

"(Late) Syed Mohammad Jaffar was one of the greatest players of hockey, who was selected for 1928 for United India (All India) Olympics Hockey team but he could not participate in that global event due to his youthful age. In 1932 All India Hockey Team which participated in Los Angeles (USA) Olympics, he was considered one of the best players in the world on the position of "Left-Out", although he was one of the youngest. He participated once again in 1936 tournament in the global tournament as vice-captain. Out of magnanimity of his heart, he decided not to be a candidate for the captaincy in favour of Dhyan Chand, although initially, he was being considered as captain of this victorious team because of his professionalism and skill level. He was not only a brilliant sportsman and a great representative (and an asset) of the country, he was also a figure of exemplary mannerism and conduct.

On a fateful evening in 1938, while on a hunting expedition on river Ravi near Lakho Dehar, he accidentally gave his life away to the river. He saddened his huge fan following and opted to respond to the call of the God."

"Gravestone laid down by Syed Javed Hassan son of (Late) Syed Mohammad Hassan"

An Urdu verse is also inscribed on the tombstone.

وہی جواں ہے قبیلے کی آنکھ کا تارا
شباب ہے جسکا بے داغ ظرب ہے کاری

References

External links
 
 Olympic profile
 Newsletter including a brief biography of Sayed Jaffar Shah
 How Alumni of Syed Mohammad Jafar's alma mater upheld his memory
 Reopening Jaffar Memorial Pavilion And New Memorial Ground Opening Ceremony
 
 

1911 births
1937 deaths
Field hockey players from Punjab, India
Olympic field hockey players of India
Field hockey players at the 1932 Summer Olympics
Field hockey players at the 1936 Summer Olympics
Indian male field hockey players
Olympic gold medalists for India
Olympic medalists in field hockey
Medalists at the 1936 Summer Olympics
Medalists at the 1932 Summer Olympics
Aitchison College alumni
Government College University, Lahore alumni
Deaths by firearm in India
Firearm accident victims
Accidental deaths in India